François Biltgen (born 28 September 1958 in Esch-sur-Alzette, Luxembourg) is a Luxembourgish politician  who has served as Minister for Justice, Minister for Communications and the Media, Minister for Religious Affairs, Minister for the Civil Service and Administrative Reform, and Minister for Higher Education and Research. until 2013.

He was born in Esch-sur-Alzette, in the south-western Luxembourg and studied law in Paris. In 1987, he was elected to the communal council of Esch-sur-Alzette, and in 1994 he was elected to the Chamber of Deputies as a Christian Social People's Party (CSV) candidate. He was elected as President of the CSV in 2003.

After the elections which was held in June 2009, he was appointed the Minister of Justice, the Minister for the Civil Service and Administrative Reform, Minister for Higher Education and Research, Minister for Communications and Media as well as the Minister for Religious Affairs. In 2009, he also signed the coalition agreement to distribute ministerial portfolios between the CSV and the LSAP delegates.

In October 2013, he became a Judge at the European Court of Justice, replacing Jean-Jacques Kasel.

Biltgen is married and is the father of two children.

References

|-

|-

|-

External links 
 Luxembourg Government: François Biltgen

Ministers for Communications of Luxembourg
Ministers for Justice of Luxembourg
Members of the Chamber of Deputies (Luxembourg)
Members of the Chamber of Deputies (Luxembourg) from Sud
Councillors in Esch-sur-Alzette
Christian Social People's Party politicians
1958 births
Living people
People from Esch-sur-Alzette
European Court of Justice judges
Luxembourgian judges of international courts and tribunals